The flag of Bulgaria is a tricolour consisting of three equal-sized horizontal bands of (from top to bottom) white, green, and red. The flag was first adopted after the 1877–1878 Russo-Turkish War, when Bulgaria gained de facto independence. The national flag at times was charged with the state emblem, especially during the communist era. The current flag was re-established with the 1991 Constitution of Bulgaria and was confirmed in a 1998 law.

History

First Bulgarian Empire
In 866, Pope Nicholas I advised Prince Boris who had recently Christianised his people to switch from the practice of using a horse tail as a banner to adopting the Holy Cross.

Later illuminated versions of the chronicles of John Skylitzes and Constantine Manasses depict the army of Khan Krum carrying flags either in monotone red, or red with a black border.  The army of Simeon the Great is also depicted carrying red banners of varying shape. The Radziwiłł Chronicle also depicts Tzar Simeon I's army under a red flag in the 921-922 campaign against Byzantium, but the depiction of the Hungarian invasion of 894 featured the Bulgarian fortress of Drastar under a white flag with a crescent and a six-pointed star. Any pictorial representations of flags in the manuscripts mentioned above, regardless of the faction or time depicted, conform strongly to the overall illustration style used in each manuscript. In addition, none of those manuscripts dates to the time of the First Bulgarian Empire. The historicity of those flags is thus impossible to verify.

Second Bulgarian Empire
Depictions of Bulgarian flags can be seen on various portolan maps from the 14th and 15th centuries. On those maps, the flags commonly have a white or golden background and depict either the insignia of the ruling House of Shishman, or unknown symbols in red. Those drawings are markedly more diverse than the flags of the neighboring countries such as the Eastern Roman Empire, the Golden Horde or the Serbian Empire, which in the same maps are largely consistent.

Third Bulgarian state
After the liberation of Bulgaria following the Russo-Turkish War in 1878, the flag was described in the Tarnovo Constitution of 1879 as follows:

From 1947 to 1990 the emblem of the People's Republic of Bulgaria was placed on the left side of the white stripe. It contained a lion within a wreath of wheat ears below a red star and above a ribbon bearing the date 9 September 1944, the day of Bulgarian coup d'état of 1944 which led to the establishment of the People's Republic of Bulgaria. In 1971, it was changed so the ribbon bearing the years 681, the year of the establishment of the First Bulgarian Empire by Asparukh and 1944.

After the fall of Communism in 1990, the then-enforced Zhivkov Constitution was amended so the flag could be reverted to the pre-Communist era. The new Constitution of Bulgaria, adopted in 1991, describes the Bulgarian flag as follows:

A popular version of the flag, which has no official status, is also commonly known. It has the full coat of arms on the left of the flag, placed across the white and green fields only.

Flag law
According to the Law for the State Seal and National Flag of the Republic of Bulgaria, promulgated on 24 April 1998:

Colours
According to the Standardisation and Metrology Committee, the following are the required colours for use in the national flag:

Gallery

Flags of the Second Bulgarian Empire

Flags of the modern Bulgarian state

See also
Coat of arms of Bulgaria
Shumi Maritsa
Mila Rodino
National Guards Unit of Bulgaria

References

External links

Bulgarian Heraldry and Vexillology Society 

Law for the State Seal and the National Flag of the Republic of Bulgaria
About Bulgarian national symbols

Bulgaria
 
National symbols of Bulgaria